Shadow of a Doubt is a 1991 American TV film. It is a remake of the 1943 Alfred Hitchcock film of the same name.

Cast
Mark Harmon as Charles Spencer
Margaret Welsh as Charlie Newton
Diane Ladd as Emma Newton
Tippi Hedren as Teresa Mathewson
Shirley Knight as Helen Potter
Norm Skaggs as Gary Graham
Mosiah Seth Smith

Production
The film was shot in Santa Rosa, California, the same town as the original. Writer John Gay added a new opening scene where Uncle Charlie seduces and murders widow Terese Mathewson.  "When you look at the original film, 10 minutes into it there isn't any doubt that Uncle Charlie is the killer," said Gay. "Since there isn't any doubt to begin with, the drama is in the girl's reaction and the family's reaction to Uncle Charlie. So I thought it would be interesting to see him do this thing."

References

External links
Shadow of a Doubt at IMDb
Shadow of a Doubt at TCMDB
Archived review of film at The Dissolve
Review at Los Angeles Times

1991 television films
1991 films
Films directed by Karen Arthur
American television films